Mavrovo is a village and tourist resort in the mountainous region of western Macedonia. It is located in the Mavrovo and Rostuša Municipality. Mavrovo is a destination for tourists throughout the year because of its skiing centre, national park and lake. There are weekend houses, inns and hotels offering accommodation for tourists all year round. The St Nicholas Church in Mavrovo was built in 1850. It was submerged in the local lake in 1953, but due to droughts in the 21st century it has largely appeared out of the lake.

Demographics
In statistics gathered by Vasil Kanchov in 1900, the village was inhabited by 1222 Bulgarian Exarchists, 12 Muslim Albanians and 25 Vlachs.

According to the 2002 census, the village had a total of 166 inhabitants. Ethnic groups in the village include:

Macedonians 163
Serbs 3

As of the 2021 census, Mavrovo had 212 residents with the following ethnic composition:
Macedonians 200
Others 10
Persons for whom data are taken from administrative sources 2

References

External links
Zare Lazareski

Villages in Mavrovo and Rostuša Municipality
Villages in North Macedonia
Ski areas and resorts in North Macedonia